The 2020 Howard Bison football team represented Howard University in the 2020–21 NCAA Division I FCS football season. The Bison played their home games at William H. Greene Stadium. They were a member of the Mid-Eastern Athletic Conference (MEAC). The Bison were led by first-year head coach Larry Scott.

On July 16, 2020, the MEAC announced that it would cancel its fall sports seasons due to the COVID-19 pandemic. The league did not rule out the possibility of playing in the spring, and later released its spring schedule on December 14, 2020.

Schedule
Howard was scheduled to compete in the 2020 playing of the Black College Football Hall of Fame Classic against  on September 6, but the game was canceled before the start of the 2020 season. Their game against Hampton was also canceled before the season began.

Home and away games against South Carolina State, scheduled for March 6 and April 10, respectively, were canceled on March 2 due to COVID-19 travel restrictions.

References

Howard
Howard Bison football seasons
College football winless seasons
Howard Bison football